Campaign to Suppress Bandits in Liuwandashan was a counter-guerrilla / counterinsurgency campaign the communists fought against the nationalist guerrilla that was mostly consisted of bandits and nationalist regular troops left behind after the nationalist regime withdrew from mainland China.  The campaign was fought during the Chinese Civil War in the post-World War II era in the region of Liuwandashan (六万大山, literally meaning Sixty-Thousand Great Mountains) in Guangxi and resulted in communist victory.  This campaign is part of Campaign to Suppress Bandits in Guangxi, which in turn, was part of Campaign to Suppress Bandits in Central and Southern China.

Prelude
In June 1950, three regiments of the communist 45th Army and the Independent 24th Regiment of Canton Southern Front Military Sub-district jointly launched an operation against the local nationalist guerrilla in the southern end of the Liuwandashan (六万大山), succeeding in killing over 1,400 of nationalists.  The remnant of the nationalist guerrilla retreated into the heart of the mountain and their number totaled more than 15,000.

Order of battle
Nationalist:
3rd Column of the Anticommunist National Salvation Army in Southern Guangxi
Communist:
460th Regiment of the Yulin Military Sub-district
Independent Regiment of the Yulin Military Sub-district
135th Division

Battles
On December 20, 1950, communist forces consisted of the 460th Regiment and the Independent Regiment of the communist Yulin Military Sub-district and the 135th Division began their eradication campaign against the nationalist guerrilla mostly consisted of bandits.  The Independent Regiment of the communist Yulin Military Sub-district attacked from the north, and 460th Regiment of the communist Yulin Military Sub-district and the 403rd Regiment of the communist 135th Division attacked from south, and the 404th Regiment of the communist 135th Division advanced toward the regions of Fengshan, (凤山), Ningtan, (宁潭), Yingqiao (英桥), Minzhi, (民治), Wangke, (王科) and Liushui (六水).  The rest of communist 135th Division advanced toward the heart of the mountain.  After killing over 300 enemy troops, the organized nationalist resistance collapsed, and the remaining battles became part of eradication operations.  By the next February, the communist victory was complete.

Conclusion
By February 1951, the campaign concluded with communist victory, with nationalist commanders Yang Fengchi (杨凤池), Da Ou (达欧), and Zeng Zhongrou (曾仲荣) either killed or captured, and the 15,000 strong nationalist guerrilla force in Liuwandashan (六万大山) completely annihilated.  In addition, the communists also captured 14 artillery pieces, 86 machine guns, and over 16,000 firearms.

See also
List of battles of the Chinese Civil War
National Revolutionary Army
History of the People's Liberation Army
Chinese Civil War

References

Zhu, Zongzhen and Wang, Chaoguang, Liberation War History, 1st Edition, Social Scientific Literary Publishing House in Beijing, 2000,  (set)
Zhang, Ping, History of the Liberation War, 1st Edition, Chinese Youth Publishing House in Beijing, 1987,  (pbk.)
Jie, Lifu, Records of the Liberation War: The Decisive Battle of Two Kinds of Fates, 1st Edition, Hebei People's Publishing House in Shijiazhuang, 1990,  (set)
Literary and Historical Research Committee of the Anhui Committee of the Chinese People's Political Consultative Conference, Liberation War, 1st Edition, Anhui People's Publishing House in Hefei, 1987, 
Li, Zuomin, Heroic Division and Iron Horse: Records of the Liberation War, 1st Edition, Chinese Communist Party History Publishing House in Beijing, 2004, 
Wang, Xingsheng, and Zhang, Jingshan, Chinese Liberation War, 1st Edition, People's Liberation Army Literature and Art Publishing House in Beijing, 2001,  (set)
Huang, Youlan, History of the Chinese People's Liberation War, 1st Edition, Archives Publishing House in Beijing, 1992, 
Liu Wusheng, From Yan'an to Beijing: A Collection of Military Records and Research Publications of Important Campaigns in the Liberation War, 1st Edition, Central Literary Publishing House in Beijing, 1993, 
Tang, Yilu and Bi, Jianzhong, History of Chinese People's Liberation Army in Chinese Liberation War, 1st Edition, Military Scientific Publishing House in Beijing, 1993 – 1997,  (Volum 1), 7800219615 (Volum 2), 7800219631 (Volum 3), 7801370937 (Volum 4), and 7801370953 (Volum 5)

Conflicts in 1950
Conflicts in 1951
Liuwandashan
1950 in China
1951 in China
Military history of Guangxi
Campaigns to Suppress Bandits